Alcohol Beverages Australia (ABA) is an Australian non-profit membership–based organisation that represents retailers, producers and manufacturers of alcohol in Australia. The current president is Greg Holland and its CEO is Andrew Wilsmore.

Background 
ABA was formed in 2015. ABA's members are producers and retailers of alcohol and the industry associations representing beer, wine, spirits and retail drinks.

The organization has been active in areas of alcohol regulation, including the NHMRC Drinking Guidelines, New South Wales lockouts, and pregnancy labelling.

Membership 
Current members are: 

 Accolade Wines
 Australian Grape & Wine
 Australian Distillers Association
 Australian Liquor Marketers
 Beam Suntory
 Brewers Association of Australia
 Brown-Forman
 Campari Group
 Coca-Cola Amatil
 Coles Liquor
 Diageo
 Endeavour Drinks Group
 Lion
 Pernod Ricard Australia
 Retail Drinks Australia
 Spirits & Cocktail Australia
 Treasury Wine Estates

Leadership

President 
The following people have served as president of ABA:

Chief Executive Officer 
The following people have served as Chief Executive Officer of ABA:

References 

Alcohol in Australia
Trade associations based in Australia
Food industry trade groups